Hector Roy Maclean, 5th Laird of Coll (flourished c. 1590–1596)

Biography
He was the son of Hector Maclean, 4th Laird of Coll. He married Marian, daughter of Hector Og Maclean, 13th Clan Chief. Hector Roy died young, and had a single child, Lachlan Maclean, 6th Laird of Coll.

References

Year of death missing
Hector
Hector
Year of birth uncertain